The Colourist is the self-titled debut studio album from American indie pop band The Colourist. The album was released on 25 March 2014.

Track listing

Charts

Album

Singles

Trivia 
"Little Games", the debut single from the band, was featured on the AT&T Nokia Lumia 1020 commercial. "Little Games" was also featured on  the video game Guitar Hero Live. It also featured with St. Lucia remix version in EA Sports football game, FIFA 14.

References 

2014 debut albums
The Colourist albums
Republic Records albums